"Environmental Quality" is a set of properties and characteristics of the environment, either generalized or local, as they impinge on human beings and other organisms. It is a measure of the condition of an environment relative to the requirements of one or more species, any human need or purpose.

Environmental quality includes the natural environment as well as the built environment, such as air, water purity or pollution, noise and the potential effects which such characteristics may have on physical and mental health.

United States
In the United States, the term is applied with a body of federal and state standards and regulations that are monitored by regulatory agencies. All states in the U.S. have some form of a department or commission that is responsible for a variety of activities such as monitoring quality, responding to citizen complaints, and enforcing environmental regulations. The agency with the lead implementation responsibility for most major federal environmental laws (e.g. Clean Air Act, Clean Water Act) is the US Environmental Protection Agency (EPA). Other federal agencies with significant oversight roles include the  Council on Environmental Quality, Department of the Interior and the Army Corps of Engineers.

United Kingdom
In the United Kingdom, the environment has been the primary responsibility of the Department for Environment, Food and Rural Affairs (DEFRA). Predecessor bodies were merged in 2001 to create this department with a broader remit to link rural activities to the natural environment. Some responsibilities are devolved to the Scottish Government and are exercised by the Scottish Environment Protection Agency (SEPA) and the National Assembly for Wales, while delivery of environmental initiatives often use partners, including: British Waterways, Environment Agency, Forestry Commission, and Natural England. DEFRA also has a remit to oversee impacts of activities within the built environment and the United Kingdom Climate Change Programme.

See also
 Environmental impact assessment
 Environmental law

References

External links
 US Army Corps of Engineers – Civil Works/Regulatory Program
 US Council on Environmental Quality
 US Department of the Interior
 US Environmental Protection Agency
 UK Defra's official website
 English Nature's website

Environmental standards